This is a list of thriller or suspense novelists.
Note that some of these may overlap with authors of crime, mystery or spy fiction.

A

B

C–D

E–F

G

H

I–J

K–L

M–N

O–P

R

S

T–W

Y–Z

See also
Thriller fiction
Spy fiction
List of crime writers
List of mystery writers

External links
International Thriller Writers (ITW) official website

 
List of thriller writers
List of thriller writers
Thriller